The UCI Road World Rankings was a men's system of ranking road bicycle racers based upon the results in all UCI-sanctioned races over a twelve-month period. The world rankings were first instituted by the UCI in 1984.

Ranking
Sean Kelly of Ireland was the first rider to be ranked world number 1 in March 1984 and was the year-end rankings leader for five years from 1984 to 1988 inclusive. The only other rider to come close to Kelly's dominance was Laurent Jalabert who topped the rankings four times, from 1995 to 1997 and again in 1999.

The competition was run in parallel to the UCI Road World Cup, which included 10 UCI races. Both were replaced at the end of the 2004 season with the inauguration of the UCI ProTour and UCI Continental Circuits. A revised version of the ProTour ranking was announced for the 2009 season, renamed UCI World Ranking.

Individual winners

References

External links
Official site archives

 
Road World Rankings
Men's road cycling
Defunct cycle racing series
Recurring sporting events established in 1984
Recurring events disestablished in 2004